The Texas House of Representatives' 67th District represents a portion of Collin County.

The current Representative of this district is Jeff Leach, a Republican from Plano who has represented the district since 2013.

The district contains portions of Plano, Allen, McKinney, Princeton, and Anna. In addition, the district all of Melissa, Farmersville, Blue Ridge, and New Hope.

List of representatives

References 

67
Collin County, Texas